James Farquhar Cardno (25 May 1912 – 15 May 1975) was a Scottish bobsledder who competed in the late 1930s. He won the bronze medal in the four-man event at the 1936 Winter Olympics in Garmisch-Partenkirchen, Germany and finished fourth in the two-man event at the same games.

References
1936 bobsleigh two-man results
Bobsleigh four-man Olympic medalists for 1924, 1932–56, and since 1964
British Olympic Association profile
DatabaseOlympics.com profile
James Cardno's profile at Sports Reference.com

1912 births
1975 deaths
People from Fraserburgh
Bobsledders at the 1936 Winter Olympics
Olympic bronze medallists for Great Britain
Olympic bobsledders of Great Britain
Olympic medalists in bobsleigh
Scottish male bobsledders
Scottish Olympic medallists
Medalists at the 1936 Winter Olympics
Sportspeople from Aberdeenshire